Ceccia is an archaeological site in Corsica. It is located in the commune of Porto-Vecchio and has been dated to 1350 BC.

References 

Archaeological sites in Corsica